The 49th Academy of Country Music Awards were held on Sunday, April 6, 2014, at the MGM Grand Garden Arena, Las Vegas, Nevada. The ceremony was hosted by Blake Shelton and Luke Bryan.

Winners and nominees 
Winners are shown in bold.

References 

Academy of Country Music Awards
Academy of Country Music Awards
Academy of Country Music Awards
Academy of Country Music Awards
Academy of Country Music Awards
Academy of Country Music Awards